Gerrardanthus lobatus is a species of plant native to eastern and southern Africa. It is a popular pot plant that grows in deciduous bushland, woodland, wooded grassland in rocky places, and also in hygrophilous and riverine forests and clearings.

References

Garden plants of Africa
Caudiciform plants
Cucurbitaceae
Taxa named by Alfred Cogniaux